Rajmund is the Polish and Hungarian equivalent of Raymond and may refer to:

Rajmund Badó (1902–1986), Hungarian wrestler who competed in the 1924 Summer Olympics and the 1928 Summer Olympics
Rajmund Fodor (born 1976), Hungarian water polo player, who played on the gold medal squads at the 2000 and 2004 Summer Olympics
Rajmund Kanelba (1897–1960), 20th century Polish painter
Rajmund Moric (born 1944), Polish politician
Rajmund Rembieliński (1774–1820), Polish nobleman (szlachcic), political activist, and landowner

Hungarian masculine given names
Polish masculine given names